Jasper Schneider (born June 20, 1979) is a North Dakota Democratic-NPL Party politician. Schneider represented the 21st legislative district in the North Dakota House of Representatives from 2006 to 2009. In 2008, he ran for North Dakota Insurance Commissioner, losing narrowly with 49.7% of the vote. On September 30, 2009, Schneider was appointed USDA Rural Development state director for North Dakota.

Schneider resigned from the North Dakota House on November 3, 2009 after being appointed State Director for the USDA Rural Development. On October 1, 2014 Schneider was appointed to be the acting administrator of the USDA Rural Utilities Service, a federal agency with a loan portfolio of $60 billion responsible for provide electric, telecom, broadband and water utilities.

References

External links
Welcome from State Director Jasper Schneider at USDA Rural Development
Representative Jasper Schneider in the 2009 North Dakota Legislative Assembly
Project Vote Smart - Representative Jasper Schneider (ND) profile
Follow the Money - Jasper Schneider
2006 campaign contributions

|-

Living people
Politicians from Fargo, North Dakota
American Lutherans
University of Jamestown alumni
Hamline University School of Law alumni
1979 births
Lawyers from Fargo, North Dakota
Democratic Party members of the North Dakota House of Representatives